La Cumbre is a village in the province of Cáceres and autonomous community of Extremadura, Spain.

References

Populated places in the Province of Cáceres